Zawodzie  is a village in the administrative district of Gmina Czarnocin, within Piotrków County, Łódź Voivodeship, in central Poland.

Geography 

References

Villages in Piotrków County